The Magic of Makeba is the seventh album by Miriam Makeba released in 1965 by RCA Victor. The album saw Makeba branching out into new material arranged by conductor Sid Bass, but it gained mixed reception and was her final album for RCA Victor.

Track listing
"When I've Passed On"	4:00
"Sunrise, Sunset"	2:40
"Autumn Song"	2:35
"You Are in Love"	3:33
"Seven Good Years"	3:09
"Sleep Tight"	3:31
"Ask The Rising Sun"	2:54
"Oxgam"	2:00
"Where Does It Lead"	2:36
"Muntu (Lullaby)"	4:10
"Erev Shel Shoshanim"	2:18
"Oh So Alone"	3:50

Personnel
Sid Bass- arranger, conductor
Mickey Crofford - engineer
Jim Marshall - photography

References

1965 albums
Miriam Makeba albums